Frank Baldwin (November 19, 1880 – October 19, 1959) was an American naval officer from Pennington, New Jersey.

Military career 
Baldwin was commissioned into the Supply Corps in 1906. During the First World War, Baldwin served with the U.S. Navy's railway batteries, with which he saw service in the Aisne-Marne and Meuse-Argonne offensives. During the Meuse-Argonne offensive, all but one of the U.S. Navy's railway batteries was dedicated to bombarding German communication lines.

In 1937, Baldwin graduated from the Naval War College, and in August 1941 he went on to command the Naval Cost Inspection Service. In 1942, Baldwin was promoted to rear admiral, before retiring in 1944. He was immediately recalled to active duty as director of the Cost Inspection Service, a position he would hold until 1950, when he retired once more.

Civilian life 
During his retirement, Baldwin was heavily involved in the Navy Mutual Aid Association (NMAA), where he filled the role of chairman of the finance committee multiple times and that of second vice-president for the association in 1955.

Frank Baldwin died on 19 October 1959, aged 78. He is buried at Arlington National Cemetery.

References

Bibliography 
 Ancell, R. Manning, Miller, Christine M. The Biographic Dictionary of World War II Generals and Flag Officers, (Westport, CT: Greenwood Press, 1996), pp. 493 
 "Admiral Carney to head NMAA", Bureau of Ships Journal, Vol. 4, No. 1, (May 1955): pp. 48
 Department of the Navy Bureau of Ordnance. Navy Ordnance Activities: World War 1917-1918, (Washington D.C.: Government Printing Office, 1920), pp. 179-201 

1880 births
1959 deaths
People from Pennington, New Jersey
Naval War College alumni
United States Navy World War II admirals
United States Navy personnel of World War I
Military personnel from New Jersey
United States Navy rear admirals (lower half)